Šalara is a settlement on the outskirts of Koper in the Littoral region of Slovenia. Old Šalara is a dispersed settlement in the hills south of Koper, while the new settlement of Šalara is part of the town itself.

References

External links
Šalara on Geopedia

Populated places in the City Municipality of Koper